This is a 'list of topics related to pi, the fundamental mathematical constant.

2 theorem  
Approximations of   
Arithmetic–geometric mean  
Bailey–Borwein–Plouffe formula  
Basel problem  
Borwein's algorithm 
Buffon's needle  
Cadaeic Cadenza  
Chronology of computation of   
Circle  
Euler's identity  
Six nines in pi  
Gauss–Legendre algorithm  
Gaussian function 
History of A History of Pi''   (book)
Indiana Pi Bill  
Leibniz formula for pi  
Lindemann–Weierstrass theorem   (Proof that  is transcendental)
List of circle topics  
List of formulae involving   
Liu Hui's  algorithm  
Mathematical constant (sorted by continued fraction representation)  
Mathematical constants and functions
Method of exhaustion  
Milü 
Pi  
Pi (art project)
Pi (letter)  
Pi Day  
PiFast  
PiHex  
Pi in the Sky
Pilish
Pimania  (computer game)
Piphilology  
Proof that  is irrational  
Proof that 22/7 exceeds   
Proof of Wallis product  
Rabbi Nehemiah  
Radian  
Ramanujan–Sato series
Rhind Mathematical Papyrus  
Salamin–Brent algorithm  
Software for calculating 
Squaring the circle  
Turn (geometry)  
Viète's formula  

Pi
List
Pi
Pi
Pi